Graeme Neil Smith (born 1963) is a Canadian obstetrician. He is Head of the Department of Obstetrics and Gynaecology in the Faculty of Health Sciences at Queen's University and clinician-scientist at Kingston General Hospital Research Institute.

Early life and education
Smith was born in 1963. He earned his medical degree and PhD from the University of Western Ontario and earned his Royal College of Surgeons of Canada certification at Queen's University.

Career
After completing sub-specialty training in Maternal-Fetal Medicine at the University of Toronto in 1999, Smith joined the faculty of Obstetrics and Gynecology at Queen's University. In 2003, he received the Premier's Research Excellence Award.

In 2011, Smith began the MotHERS Program Mothers Health Education, Research and Screening) at Kingston General Hospital. His research team developed an app called "Maternelle" which allowed mothers and their family doctor to track their patients health during pregnancy. Two years later, Smith was appointed Head of the Department of Obstetrics and Gynaecology in the Faculty of Health Sciences at Queen's University.

By 2016, his team received a $9.8 million grant from the Canadian Institutes of Health Research to continue their research into maternal and child health. He was later reappointed Head of the Department of Obstetrics and Gynaecology in the Faculty of Health Sciences at Queen's University for another five-year term.

Personal life
Smith is married to obstetrician/gynaecologist Susan Chamberlain and together they have two children.

References 

Living people
1963 births
Academic staff of Queen's University at Kingston
University of Western Ontario alumni
Canadian obstetricians